Calgary South was a federal electoral district in Alberta, Canada, that was represented in the House of Commons of Canada from 1953 to 1988.

This riding was created in 1952 from parts of Bow River, Calgary West and Calgary East ridings.

It was abolished in 1987 when it was redistributed into Calgary Southwest and Calgary West ridings.

Election results

See also 
 Calgary South provincial electoral district
 List of Canadian federal electoral districts
 Past Canadian electoral districts

External links 
 

Former federal electoral districts of Alberta
Politics of Calgary